Szatmár County was an administrative county (comitatus) of the Kingdom of Hungary, situated south of the river Tisza. Most of its territory is now divided between Romania and Hungary, while a very small area is part of Ukraine.
The capital of the county was Nagykároly (now Carei).

Geography

After 1876, Szatmár county shared borders with the former Hungarian counties of Szabolcs, Bereg, Ugocsa, Máramaros, Szolnok-Doboka, Szilágy and Bihar. It was situated south of the river Tisza. The rivers Crasna, Someş, Lăpuș and Tur flowed through the county. Its area was 6,257 km2 around 1910.

History

Szatmár county was formed in the 11th century, with the center in Szatmárnémeti (now Satu Mare). In Ottoman times, the county mostly belonged to Partium. In 1876, when the administrative structure of the Kingdom of Hungary was changed, part of the territory of the former Kővárvidék/Chioar district was annexed to Szatmár.

In 1920, the Treaty of Trianon assigned most of the territory of the county to Romania. The northwest of the county remained in Hungary, and formed the new county of Szatmár-Ugocsa-Bereg in 1923, with parts of the former Bereg and Ugocsa counties (the capital of this county was Mátészalka, which was previously in Szatmár county). The village of Nagypalád (now Velika Palad') was passed to Czechoslovakia in 1921, after a border adjustment agreement with Romania (according to the agreement, the villages of Akli/Okli and Fertősalmás/Fertesolmas were also passed to Czechoslovakia, whereas Bocskó/Bocicău, Ugocsakomlós/Comlăușa, Avaspatak/Valea Seacă and Nagytarna/Tarna Mare were passed to Romania).

By the First Vienna Award, Nagypalád was returned to Hungary and the county was recreated and later expanded with the Romanian part by the Second Vienna Award in 1940. After the end of World War II, this part became again part of Romania and Nagypalád was passed to the Soviet Union, while the remaining territory in Hungary was renamed to Szatmár-Bereg county.

In 1950, Szatmár-Bereg County was merged with large parts of Szabolcs county to form Szabolcs-Szatmár county. This county was renamed Szabolcs-Szatmár-Bereg in the 1990s.

The Romanian part of the county is now part of Satu Mare County, except for the easternmost part (including Baia Mare), which is in Maramureș County.

Demographics

Subdivisions

In the early 20th century, the subdivisions of Szatmár county were:

Csenger, Fehérgyarmat and Mátészalka are now in Hungary; the other towns mentioned are now in Romania.

See also
Satu Mare County, Romania

Notes

References

States and territories established in 1938
States and territories disestablished in 1920
States and territories disestablished in 1923
States and territories disestablished in 1945
Counties in the Kingdom of Hungary